Robert Ssejjemba (born 5 December 1980) is a retired Ugandan professional soccer player and the current coach of the Wayland Baptist University men's soccer program.

Career
Late in the 2006 Major League Soccer season he made one start for D.C. United, but was not signed to a professional contract by them. He then played the 2007 season with the Richmond Kickers before moving to the Charlotte Eagles for the 2008 season. In the 2008 USL Second Division final with the Eagles, however, an ACL injury ended Ssejjemba's playing career. He also made several appearances for the Ugandan national team, including qualifiers for the 2006 World Cup.

In 2009, he became the head coach of the revived men's soccer program at Virginia Intermont College, his alma mater. After the college closed permanently, he became the head coach for the University of the Southwest men's team from 2014 until 2019. In 2019, he became the head coach of Wayland Baptist University.

References

External links

 Robert Ssejjemba at Weyland Baptist Athletics

1980 births
American soccer coaches
Charlotte Eagles players
D.C. United players
Kalamazoo Kingdom players
Living people
Major League Soccer players
People from Bristol, Virginia
Sportspeople from Kampala
USL League Two players
Richmond Kickers players
Ugandan football managers
Ugandan footballers
Ugandan Protestants
USL First Division players
USL Second Division players
Virginia Intermont College alumni
Association football forwards
Ugandan expatriate footballers
Expatriate soccer players in the United States
Uganda international footballers
Wayland Baptist Pioneers men's soccer coaches